The State is an American daily newspaper published in Columbia, South Carolina. The newspaper is owned and distributed by The McClatchy Company in the Midlands region of the state. It is, by circulation, the second-largest newspaper in South Carolina after The Post and Courier.

History
The newspaper, first published on February 18, 1891. was founded by two brothers, N.G. Gonzales and A.E. Gonzales.  In 1903, N. G. Gonzales was fatally shot by lieutenant governor James H. Tillman, who was later acquitted of murder charges.

In 1945, The State bought its rival, the  Columbia Record, with the parent company becoming The State-Record Company. The paper's owners diversified in 1971 by founding "State Telecasting Company." State Telecasting purchased two television stations in New Mexico and Texas, along with a station in South Carolina. KCBD in Lubbock, Texas and its full-time satellite KSWS in Roswell, New Mexico were acquired in 1971 for $6 million from the Joe Bryant estate. WUSN-TV in nearby Charleston, South Carolina was acquired and the call letters changed to WCBD-TV to conform with those of KCBD. The paper remained in the hands of the Gonzales family until 1986, when Knight Ridder purchased the State-Record Company and six subsidiaries (including the Sun Herald and The Sun News) for $311 million. In 2006, Knight Ridder was purchased by McClatchy.

In 2020, McClatchy filed for bankruptcy and was purchased by hedge fund, Chatham Asset Management for $312 million.

Background 
Its news staff was a Pulitzer Prize finalist in general news reporting for its Hurricane Hugo coverage in 1989. Its cartoonist, Robert Ariail, was a Pulitzer finalist in 1995 and 2000. Reporter Gina Smith and current projects editor broke the Mark Sanford scandal story on June 24, 2009 when she interviewed Sanford at Atlanta Hartsfield Airport as he returned from Argentina.

According to the newspaper's Web site, it has 440 full-time employees and another 31 who work part-time, not including an on-premises "McClatchy Customer Care Center for subscriber assistance."

In 2017, the McClatchy Company listed the State's Columbia headquarters building for sale for $17,000,000.

See also

 List of newspapers in South Carolina

References

External links
 
 The State Self-Service Advertising - McClatchy Ad Manager
 McClatchy Advertising - WinWithMcClatchy.com

Mass media in Columbia, South Carolina
McClatchy publications
Newspapers published in South Carolina
Publications established in 1891
1891 establishments in South Carolina